Emil Jensen is a Swedish singer-songwriter, comedian and actor based in Sweden. Emil Jensen has outspoken environmentalist views. In 2007 he toured Sweden by bicycle. He has also made a tour by train. The latter was also made into a film, 300 eMil.
In 2008 he starred in the Swedish drama Everlasting Moments which was his debut as an actor.
Jensen has made 4 albums: Kom hem som nån annan (2004), Orka då (2006), his  self titled album in 2008 and the recently released Rykten (2011).

Discography

Albums

References

1974 births
Living people
Swedish comedians
Swedish poets
Swedish male writers
Swedish male singer-songwriters
Swedish singer-songwriters
Swedish-language singers
21st-century Swedish singers
21st-century Swedish male singers